Gallium(II) sulfide, GaS, is a chemical compound of gallium and sulfur. The normal form of gallium(II) sulfide as made from the elements has a hexagonal layer structure containing Ga24+ units which have a Ga-Ga distance of 248pm. This layer structure is similar to GaTe, GaSe and InSe. An unusual metastable form, with a distorted wurtzite structure has been reported as being produced using MOCVD. The metal organic precursors were di-tert-butyl gallium dithiocarbamates, for example GatBu2(S2CNMe2) and this was deposited onto GaAs. The structure of the GaS produced in this way is presumably Ga2+ S2−.

Single layers of gallium sulfide are dynamically stable two-dimensional semiconductors, in which the valence band has an inverted Mexican-hat shape, leading to a Lifshitz transition as the hole-doping is increased.

References

Sulfides
Gallium compounds